The Brazil women's junior national handball team is the national under-19 handball team of Brazil. Controlled by the Brazil Handball Federation that is an affiliate of the International Handball Federation IHF and also a part of the South and Central America Handball Confederation SCAHC. The team represents the country in international matches.

IHF Junior World Championship record 
 Champions   Runners up   Third place   Fourth place

References

External links
Official Website

Handball in Brazil
Women's national junior handball teams
H